Amira is a 2021 Arabic drama film directed by Egyptian filmmaker Mohamed Diab. The film is produced by Mohamed Hefzy for Film Clinic, Mona Abdelwahab for Agora Audiovisuals, Moez Masoud for Acamedia Pictures in co-production with Youssef El Taher for Taher Media Production and Rula Nasser for The Imaginarium Films. The film stars Tara Abboud in the titular role, whereas Saba Mubarak, and Ali Suliman made supportive roles. The film revolves around Amira, a 17-year-old Palestinian, who is told that she was conceived with the smuggled sperm of her imprisoned father, Nawar.

This is the first film by an Egyptian director set in Palestine. The film had its world premiere at Venice International Film Festival on September 3, 2021, and competed within the Orizzonti competition. At the festival, the film won two awards: the Lanterna Magica Award and the Interfilm Award. In August, the film was selected to compete at the Feature Narrative Competition in the fifth edition of Egypt's El Gouna Film Festival (GFF), which marked its first Arab world premiere.

It was selected as the Jordanian entry for the Best International Feature Film at the 94th Academy Awards, but it was withdrawn by the Royal Film Commission due to controversy surrounding the film's subject matter. The film, which centers on a Palestinian girl who learns her real father was an Israeli prison guard rather than a Palestinian prisoner, was criticised by prisoners' rights organisations and withdrawn "out of respect to the feelings of the prisoners and their families."

Cast 
 Tara Abboud as Amira
 Saba Mubarak as Warda 
 Ali Suliman as Nawar 
 Suhaib Nashwan as Ziad 
 Ziad Bakri as Basel
 Waleed Zuaiter as Said
 Sameera Asir as Reema
 Saleh Bakri as Etai
 Reem Talhami as Grandmother
 Is'haq Elias as Suleiman
 Kais Nashef as Hani
 Mohammad Ghassan as Yaser
 Assaf al Rousan as Doctor #3
 Nadeem Rimawi as Soldier

See also
 List of submissions to the 94th Academy Awards for Best International Feature Film
 List of Jordanian submissions for the Academy Award for Best International Feature Film

References

External links 
 

Jordanian drama films
Egyptian drama films
2021 films
2021 drama films